Unsafe firearm and cartridge combinations are combinations of firearms and cartridges which can cause an unsafe condition for the shooter when firing.

The unsafe condition can arise due to use of a cartridge intended for another chambering (see SAAMI list below), or using overpressure ammunition in a firearm not designed for such pressures, or using explosive (tampered) ammunition, or otherwise unsafe ammunition.

Another example of an unsafe firearm and cartridge combination is the firing of saboted rounds in firearms with muzzle devices (such as a flash suppressor, muzzle brake, or choke) unless the muzzle device has been specifically designed for safe use with that particular type of saboted ammunition (see Saboted ammunition and muzzle devices below).

SAAMI listing 
The U.S. based Sporting Arms and Ammunition Manufacturers' Institute (SAAMI) has listed a number of known unsafe firearm chamber and cartridge combinations which can happen due to mixing of different common cartridges.

Examples include:

 Firing a .22 Long Rifle round in a .17 HMR rifle
 Firing a .357 Magnum round in a .38 Special revolver (the opposite is however is a safe and very common practice)
 Firing a 9×19 mm round in a .40 S&W pistol
 Firing a .300 Blackout round in a .223 Remington rifle
 Firing shotgun shell of the correct gauge or bore, but in a chamber length that is too short (for example a 70 mm shell in 65 mm chamber)

While the table below lists most unsafe combinations known by SAAMI, the list is not exhaustive of all dangerous combinations due to the large number of cartridges.

Saboted ammunition and muzzle devices 
Saboted ammunition use an accelerator (often made of plastic) to propel a much smaller projectile in a large bore. An example of such ammunition is a saboted light armor penetrator (SLAP), like for example the 12.7×99 mm round designated as M962.

Muzzle devices, like a flash suppressor, muzzle brake or choke, and with muzzle brakes in particular, can cause material buildup from copper, lead, etc. upon firing. In particular, firing of saboted ammunition in firearms with muzzle devices can leave behind residue in the bore upon firing, which can cause an increase in barrel and chamber pressure in subsequent firing. The Hard-Target Interdiction sniper manual contains the following warning on page 411:

The manual goes on to say that such obstructions may be hard to detect upon visual inspection, and that the obstruction is likely to become dislodged and thus be not be discoverable after a catastrophic failure.

It is also known that other obstructions in the bore, such as ice, mud or even moisture, can cause similar increases in barrel pressure.

Examples of common cartridge misuses 
In Norway there have been several examples of .308 Winchester cartridges being fired in Norwegian K98k surplus rifles rechambered for .30-06 Springfield. In Norwegian military nomenclature the first is called 7.62×51 mm (nicknamed "7.62 kort", literally 7.62 short), while the latter is called 7.62×63 mm (nicknamed "7.62 lang", literally 7.62 long). Both cartidges are very common hunting cartridges in Norway. The practice of firing the shorter .308 cartridge means that the case will lack support against the chamber walls in the .30-06 chamber, which will deform the brass heavily during firing. This can be dangerous and cause a case head separation. The phenomena was at one point so common that the brass formed from such firing earned the nickname .30 Idiot, "a cartridge named after its users". The confusion might have arisen due the many German rifles being left behind in Norway after World War II and subsequently used by the Norwegian Armed Forces. The Norwegian coastal artillery chose to keep their K98k's in their original 8x57 mm chambering, while the Norwegian Army og Norwegian Air Force rechambered their rifles at Kongsberg Våpenfabrikk. .30-06 was chosen, as this was the standard of the U.S. Army at that time, but the barrels were only marked as "7.62". In 1954, NATO introduced 7.62×51 mm NATO as their standard cartridge, and a small number of Mauser carbines were rebuilt to 7.62×51 mm with the designation "7,62 mm Mauser M98kF2" (with F2 meaning "forbedring 2", or literally improvement 2). The sniper rifle Kongsberg M59 was also chambered for 7.62×51 mm. At the same time, 7.62×51 mm was the standard cartridge of the National Rifle Association of Norway, which could cause further confusion. Most of the Norwegian armed forces transitioned to the AG-3 from 1966, but Mauser actions chambered in .30-06 were used by the reserve forces in the Norwegian Home Guard until transition to the AG-3 was started in the early 1970s. Surplus rifles from the home guard chambered in .30-06 continued to be sold to military personnel, civilian shooters and hunters until around 2005.

There is also an example of 8×57 mm cartridges being fired in .30-06 rifles, which produced empty casings humorously nicknamed "7.62×57". In one instance at least four rounds were fired before the error was discovered, and the firearm did not explode.

See also 
 Lists of gun cartridges
 Wildcat cartridge
 Delta L problem

References 

Pistol and rifle cartridges